Dušan Bavdek (born July 17, 1971 in Kranj) is a Slovenian composer.

See also
List of Slovenian composers

References

Slovenian composers
Male composers
1971 births
Living people
Musicians from Kranj
Slovenian male musicians